Charles Lyons may refer to:

Charles R. Lyons (1933–1999), professor of drama and comparative literature at Stanford University
Charles W. Lyons (1868–1939), Jesuit and president of several Catholic universities